The End was a British psychedelic pop band formed in 1965 by Dave Brown (bass, vocals) and Colin Giffin (guitar, lead vocals) following the demise of The Innocents. Nick Graham (keyboards, vocals) and John Horton (saxophone) joined from Dickie Pride's backing group, The Original Topics, and Roger Groom (drums) of The Tuxedos completed the line-up. The band was produced by Rolling Stone Bill Wyman, who arranged for them to tour with his group. After the tour, Grooms quit and was replaced by Hugh Atwooll, an old friend of Graham. Horton would also quit, but continued to work with the band on their second single, "Shades of Orange". In 1969, the band released their only album, Introspection.

They are not to be confused with the similarly named California band, who released two singles for Kabron Records in 1966–67.

Discography
 Introspection (1969)
 End (1970)
 The Last Word (2000)

References

External links
Biography: "Shades of The End"
The End por la Gran Vía 1,2,3, al escondite inglés

Musical groups established in 1965
Psychedelic pop music groups